Burmese amber is fossil resin dating to the early Late Cretaceous Cenomanian age recovered from deposits in the Hukawng Valley of northern Myanmar. It is known for being one of the most diverse Cretaceous age amber paleobiotas, containing rich arthropod fossils, along with uncommon vertebrate fossils and even rare marine inclusions. A mostly complete list of all taxa described up until 2018 can be found in Ross 2018; its supplement Ross 2019b covers most of 2019.

Hymenoptera

References

 
Prehistoric fauna by locality